Rapidly Attachable Fluid Transfer Interface (RAFTI) is a standard interface for transferring fluids, e.g., propellants, in space. It has been defined by a group of 30 companies.

The interface specification has high and low pressure variants, both for operation between -40 °C and 120 °C.
 Low pressure : for MMH, UDMH, Water, H2O2, Methanol, Kerosene, Green Monoprops, isopropyl alcohol, HFE, N2O. (fluids)
 High pressure : for Nitrogen, Helium, Xenon, Krypton. (gases)

A first implementation is planned to be tested in space in 2021 as part of a prototype fuel depot. A free flying orbital demo was launched in June 2021 to test transfers of high-test peroxide.

See also 
 Robotic Refueling Mission NASA tests on the ISS (including cryogenic)

References

Rocket propellants